Heliophanoides is a genus of the spider family Salticidae (jumping spiders).

Name
The genus name is an alteration of the salticid genus name Heliophanus with the meaning "having the likeness of Heliophanus".

Species
As of May 2017, the World Spider Catalog lists the following species in the genus:
 Heliophanoides bhutanicus Prószyński, 1992 – Bhutan
 Heliophanoides epigynalis Prószyński, 1992 – India
 Heliophanoides spermathecalis Prószyński, 1992 – India

References

Salticidae
Spiders of Asia
Salticidae genera